The Dikwa Emirate is one of the successor states to the old Bornu Empire, a traditional state within Borno State, Nigeria. It was established in 1901 at the start of the colonial period after the Bornu empire had been partitioned between the British, French and Germans.

History

The old Bornu Empire, collapsed in 1893 when the Shuwa Arab Rabeh Zubayr ibn Fadl Allah seized power and transferred the capital to Dikwa.
After the French, then expanding in West Africa, defeated and killed Rabih they installed Shehu Sanda Kura, a member of the old Bornu dynasty, as the first Shehu of Borno in Dikwa in 1900. In 1901 they replaced him by his brother Umar Abubakar Garbai, ancestor of the current Emirs of Borno. Based on a treaty between the French, Germans and British, the old Bornu was split up and Dikwa became part of the German colony of Cameroon. The British invited Umar Abubakar Garbai to become ruler of the British portion, and he moved in 1902 first to Monguno and later to Maiduguri.

The Germans installed Abubakar's brother, Shehu Sanda Mandara, in his place in Dikwa. On his death in 1917 he was succeeded by Shehu Sanda Kyarimi. 
Dikwa was transferred to the British in 1918 after the German defeat in the First World War.
Shehu Masta II Kyarimi was appointed the Shehu of Dikwa in 1937 with his palace in Dikwa town, but moved the palace to Bama in 1942 on the request of the colonial administration.

Until recently, the Dikwa Emirate was one of three in Borno State, the others being the Borno Emirate and the Biu Emirate.
In March 2010 the Borno State Governor Ali Modu Sheriff split the old Dikwa Emirate into the new Bama and Dikwa Emirates. 
The new Dikwa emirate was made up of three local government areas, Ngala, Dikwa and Kala Balge, with headquarters in Dikwa town. 
The Bama emirate retains the Bama local government area, and retains the old Dikwa Emirate palace in Bama. 
Alhaji Abba Tor Shehu Masta II, son of Shehu Masta II, was appointed the emir of the new Dikwa Emirate.
Mai Kyari Elkanemi, emir of the old Dikwa continued as the new Emir of Bama.

Rulers

Rulers of the Dikwa emirate, with the title of "Shehu", were:

February 1 Alhaji Abba Jato Umar b. 1968

Local Government Areas in Dikwa Emirate 
Dikwa Emirate covers four Local Government Areas:
 Bama
 Dikwa
 Ngala
 Kala-Balge

References

Borno State
History of Nigeria
Nigerian traditional states
Emirates